The Rolls-Royce Trent 700 is a high-bypass turbofan produced by Rolls-Royce plc to power the Airbus A330.

Rolls-Royce was studying a RB211 development for the A330 at its launch in June 1987.
It was first selected by Cathay Pacific in April 1989, first ran in summer 1992, was certified in January 1994 and was put into service on 24 March 1995.

Keeping the characteristic three-shaft architecture of the RB211, it is the first variant of the Trent family.
With its  fan for a 5:1 bypass ratio, it produces 300.3 to 316.3 kN (67,500-71,100 lbf) of thrust and reach an overall pressure ratio of 36:1.
It competes with the General Electric CF6-80E1 and the PW4000 to power the A330.

Development
When Airbus launched its A330 twin-jet in June 1987, its only engine options included the General Electric CF6-80C2 and the Pratt & Whitney PW4000.

By February 1992, design work was completed for the  fan,  Trent 700 and the first test was scheduled for July.
By then, the earlier  fan,  Trent 600 for the MD-11 was abandoned due to lack of customers.
By September, the first engine was running and was to be joined by five others by the end of the year.
Certification was applied for on 30 June 1991 and was granted on 24 January 1994.
The first Trent 700-powered A330 flew in August 1994.
Cathay Pacific introduced it in March 1995.
90-minutes ETOPS approval was achieved in March 1995, and this was extended to 120 minutes in December 1995 and 180 minutes in May 1996.
The Trent 700 was the third engine to market on the A330, after GE and PW.

Design  
The Trent 700 is an axial flow, high bypass turbofan with three coaxial shafts.
The fan has 26 Wide Chord Blades and is powered by a 4-stage low pressure turbine.
The 8-stage IP compressor and 6-stage HP compressor are both driven by a single stage turbine.
The single annular combustor has 24 Spray Nozzles.
The engine is controlled by an EEC.

Operational history

By July 1999, the Trent had secured a nearly 40% share of engine orders for the A330.

In 2009, Rolls-Royce introduced an upgraded version of the engine dubbed the Trent 700EP (enhanced performance) which incorporated a package of improvements derived from later members of the Trent engine family (especially the Trent 1000). These included elliptical leading edges and optimised fan and high-pressure turbine tip clearances. Together the improvements provided a 1.2% improvement to the Trent 700's specific fuel consumption. Some of the improvements were also made available as a retro-fit kit to existing airlines.

Further upgrades were announced in 2013 as part of the T700EP2 package (EIS in late 2016). The upgraded engine was to be available in 2015, intended for higher gross weight A330s. The upgrade package was to improve fuel efficiency by about 1% and was likely to be the last upgrade of Trent 700. It was also potentially to be made available as a retrofit package in the future.

Rolls-Royce claims that the Trent 700 has the lowest life cycle fuel burn, and is the quietest and cleanest engine available on the A330. Cathay Pacific is the largest operator, with 31 Trent 700-powered A330s. Rolls received orders for 140 of the type during the Paris Air Show in June 2007.

By July 2018, the Trent 700 had flown 50 million hours
and Rolls-Royce claimed a 60% market share.
By June 2019, an Aeroflot Trent 700 which had entered service in 2008 had completed over 50,000 hours without requiring an overhaul – a record for a widebody engine.

Applications
 Airbus A330
 Airbus BelugaXL
 Airbus A330 MRTT

Variants
Trent 768-60
Used on the Airbus A330-341 variant.
Trent 772-60
Used on the Airbus A330-342 variant.
Trent 772B-60
Used on the Airbus A330-243 and Airbus A330-343 variants.
Trent 772C-60
Used on the Airbus A330-243 and Airbus A330-343 variants.

Specifications (Trent 700)

See also

References

Notes

External links

High-bypass turbofan engines
Trent 700
1990s turbofan engines